Gay and Devilish is a 1922 American silent comedy film directed by William A. Seiter and starring Doris May, Cullen Landis and Otis Harlan.

Cast
 Doris May as Fanchon Browne
 Cullen Landis as Peter Armitage
 Otis Harlan as Peter Armitage, the uncle
 Jacqueline Logan as Lilah Deane
 Bull Montana as Tony
 Lila Leslie as Aunt Bessie
 Edward Cooper as The Butler
 Arthur Millett as 	First Detective
 Kingsley Benedict as Second Detective
 Milton Ross as Third Detective
 George Periolat as Nethercote

References

Bibliography
 Munden, Kenneth White. The American Film Institute Catalog of Motion Pictures Produced in the United States, Part 1. University of California Press, 1997.

External links
 

1922 films
1922 comedy films
1920s English-language films
American silent feature films
Silent American comedy films
American black-and-white films
Films directed by William A. Seiter
Film Booking Offices of America films
Films with screenplays by Garrett Fort
1920s American films